Razin may refer to:

People
 Aharon Razin (1935–2019), Israeli biochemist
 Albert Razin (1940–2019), Udmurt language rights activist and Neopaganist who committed self-immolation
 Andrey Razin (disambiguation)
 Stenka Razin (Stepan Timofeyevich Razin, 1630–1671), Cossack leader
 Stenka Razin (film), a short silent film
 Stenka Razin (Glazunov), a symphonic poem 
 The Execution of Stepan Razin, a cantata by Shostakovich
 Razin, born on 23 April 2001, is an upcoming writer from Kerala, India. He is the author of the poetry book "Whirling Around the Stars", which is a collection of some space fantasies and love poetries.

Places
 Razin, Ahar, East Azerbaijan Province, Iran
 Razin, Khoda Afarin, East Azerbaijan Province, Iran
 Razin, Hamadan, Hamadan Province, Iran
 Razin, Kermanshah, Kermanshah Province, Iran
 Razin, Markazi, Markazi Province, Iran